Chess Players Association of India (CPAI) is an association of chess players in India affiliated to the All India Chess Federation. The objective of this association is to serve a common forum for players for Indian chess players and promote the game in particular.

History
The CPAI had formed to protest a 10% prize money cut imposed on the players by the All India Chess Federation in mid-2004. The association has stuck ever since catering to the needs of the players and forming a group to protect the rights of the Indian chess players

References

External links
 Official Website
 News
 Editor of CPAI

Chess organizations